Deafplanet is a Canadian television series for children in American Sign Language (ASL). It was created by marblemedia in collaboration with TVOntario and the Canadian Cultural Society of the Deaf. A French-language version of the show was also produced, using Quebec Sign Language (LSQ).

The TV series aired in Canada on provincial broadcasters TVOntario, Access, SCN and Knowledge. The show debuted in late 2003 and lasted for two seasons. The entire series has since been made available on the Encore+ channel on YouTube.

Plot
The show follows the character Max, who one day was fooling around with a museum rocket display and accidentally launched himself into space. He lands on "Deafplanet", where he meets a deaf teenager Kendra (Amanda Richer). She only uses sign language, but with the help of an interpreting robot, Max is able to understand her. She is determined to help Max get back to his home.

Episodes

Season 1

Season 2

Streaming
As of 2017 the show has begun streaming online for free on Canada Media Fund's Encore+ YouTube channel.

Awards

References

External links
deafplanet website
 Production website

Sign language television shows
2000s Canadian children's television series
Deaf culture
TVO original programming
Television shows about deaf people